Pyloderma is a genus of sponges belonging to the family Dendoricellidae.

The species of this genus are found in Pacific Ocean.

Species:
 Pyloderma demonstrans Dendy, 1924

References

Poecilosclerida
Sponge genera